The Arain of Delhi are an Urdu-speaking Muslim community found in Delhi, India.

References

Arain
Islam in Delhi
Muslim communities of India
Social groups of Pakistan
Social groups of Delhi